The High Life is Reef the Lost Cauze's debut album, with producer Sleep E on most of the tracks. Reef displays a wide variety of topics and stories from a relationship ending badly (Bitter) to eating children (Impregnable).

Track listing

 "Intro (Big Hit Man)"
 "30 Seconds"
 "Sound the Horns"
 "Bitter"
 "Yousa Bird"
 "Impregnable"
 "The Shining"
 "Broke In" (featuring Sleep E)
 "So Much Stress" (featuring Haskeem)
 "Wicked Karma"
 "Who Me?" (featuring B at Ease & Sleep E)
 "Outro"

Reef the Lost Cauze albums
2001 debut albums